Albertus Jacobus Duymaer van Twist (20 February 1809 – 3 December 1887) was the Governor-General of the Dutch East Indies from 1851 to 1856.

Taxon named in his honor 
The fish yellow-breasted wrasse, Anampses twistii was named after him.
Iniistius twistii, the Redblotch razorfish, is a species of marine ray-finned fish from the family Labridae, the wrasses. It is found in the Western Pacific Ocean.

References

External links
 

1809 births
1887 deaths
Governors-General of the Dutch East Indies
Leiden University alumni
Members of the Senate (Netherlands)
Ministers of State (Netherlands)
People from Deventer
Speakers of the House of Representatives (Netherlands)